The Secretary of Labor and Human Resources of Puerto Rico is responsible for the development and management of all matters related to labor and human resources in the government of Puerto Rico. The secretary heads the Department of Labor and Human Resources.

Former holders
 Prudencio Rivera Martinez (1930s)
 Manuel A. Perez
 Miguel Romero
 Carlos Saavedra Gutiérrez
 Vance Thomas

References

Council of Secretaries of Puerto Rico